Sandygate is a football and cricket stadium in the Sheffield suburb of Crosspool, South Yorkshire, England.  It is home to Hallam F.C. and Hallam C.C.

First opened in 1804, Hallam F.C. have played at the ground since 1860.  Sandygate has been recognised by the Guinness Book of Records as the "Oldest Football Ground in the World". On 26 December 1860, the world's first inter-club football match was played at the ground, Hallam taking on Sheffield F.C.

The ground offers viewing for spectators from 3 sides of the pitch, the Shed End, the Main Stand and the Cricket Net End. 

The Shed End

The Shed End is a covered terrace behind the goal on Sandygate Road. This mainly houses the vocal home supporters and is where the bulk of the atmosphere is created.

References 

Cricket grounds in South Yorkshire
Football venues in Sheffield
Hallam F.C.
Sports venues completed in 1804